Century is the first single to be taken from The Long Blondes second album "Couples". It was released on March 24, 2008, as a limited edition 7" single and digital download.

The b-side to "Century", "The Unbearable Lightness of Buildings", was written specifically for Tate Modern as part of their 12-week-long Tate Tracks that was held at the beginning of April 2007. The idea was Tate invited The Long Blondes to walk around the gallery and find a work of art that would inspire them to write a track. In the end, it was Jannis Kounellis's Untitled that grabbed their attention. They said "Untitled caught our eye because we saw the stark industrial landscape and pictured ourselves within it".

Track listing
A: "Century"
B: "The Unbearable Lightness of Buildings"

All lyrics written by Kate Jackson and Dorian Cox, music by The Long Blondes.

References 

Songs written by Kate Jackson (singer)
Songs written by Dorian Cox
2008 singles
The Long Blondes songs
2008 songs
Rough Trade Records singles